Anankastic may refer to:

 Anankastic conditional, a grammatical construction
 Obsessive-compulsive personality disorder, also called "Anankastic personality disorder"